The 2020 Eastern Kentucky Colonels football team represented Eastern Kentucky University during the 2020–21 NCAA Division I FCS football season. They were led by Walt Wells in his first season as the program's 15th head coach. The Colonels played their home games at Roy Kidd Stadium and competed as a member of the Ohio Valley Conference.

Previous season

The Colonels finished the 2019 season 7–5, 5–3 in OVC play to finish in fourth place. After the season, head coach Mark Elder was fired after compiling a record of 21–24 over four seasons. On December 9, 2019, Walt Wells was named the team's new head coach.

Schedule
While the Ohio Valley Conference moved conference games to the spring of 2021, due to the COVID-19 pandemic, while allowing member schools to play four non-conference games in the fall of 2020, Eastern Kentucky scheduled eight non-conference games for the fall of 2020.

Game summaries

at Marshall

at West Virginia

References

Eastern Kentucky
Eastern Kentucky Colonels football seasons
Eastern Kentucky Colonels football